Ankazobe is a municipality in Analamanga Region, in the Central Highlands of Madagascar. It is the administrative capital of Ankazobe District and is situated at 75 km north of the capital Antananarivo.

Infrastructure
Route Nationale 4 from Antananarivo to Mahajanga.
 Route d'Interet Provinciale 40T (RIP 40T) from the RN 4/Ankazobe to Talata-Angavo

Epidemcs
In November 2022 the pest had been reported from this municipality.

Killing of Ankazobe
Only few months earlier in August 2022 the killing of Ankazobe took place.  35 people of this village were locked up in a cabin that was set on fire by some dahalo (bandits).

Nature reserves
The Ambohitantely Special Reserve is situated at 30 km in the North-East of the town.

References

Populated places in Analamanga